The transverse tarsal joint or midtarsal joint or Chopart's joint is formed by the articulation of the calcaneus with the cuboid (the calcaneocuboid joint), and the articulation of the talus with the navicular (the talocalcaneonavicular joint).

The movement which takes place in this joint is more extensive than that in the other tarsal joints, and consists of a sort of rotation by means of which the foot may be slightly flexed or extended, the sole being at the same time carried medially (inverted) or laterally (everted).

The term Chopart's joint is named after the French surgeon François Chopart.

References

Further reading

External links
 Diagram at ouhsc.edu

Joints